Singapore competed at the 1976 Summer Olympics in Montreal, Quebec, Canada.

Results by event

Athletics
Chee Swee Lee

Judo
Koh Eng Kian

Shooting
Frank Oh

Weightlifting
Chua Koon Siong

References
Official Olympic Reports
sports-reference

Nations at the 1976 Summer Olympics
1976
1976 in Singaporean sport